Walter von Pezold (20 September 1882 Tallinn – 3 June 1955 Hamburg, West Germany) was a politician. He was a member of I Riigikogu. He was a member of the Riigikogu since 4 January 1921. He replaced Hermann-Leopold Ammende. In addition, from 4 January 1921, he was also Riigikogu's Second Assistant Secretary.

References

1882 births
1955 deaths
Politicians from Tallinn
People from Kreis Harrien
Baltic-German people
German-Baltic Party politicians
Members of the Riigikogu, 1920–1923
Estonian emigrants to Germany